Yes are  an English progressive rock band formed in London in 1968 by lead singer and frontman Jon Anderson, bassist Chris Squire, guitarist Peter Banks, keyboardist Tony Kaye, and drummer Bill Bruford. The band has undergone numerous line-up changes throughout their history, during which 20 musicians have been full-time members. Since February 2023, the band has consisted of guitarist Steve Howe, keyboardist Geoff Downes, bassist Billy Sherwood, singer Jon Davison, and drummer Jay Schellen. Yes have explored several musical styles over the years and are most notably regarded as progressive rock pioneers.

Yes began performing original songs and rearranged covers of rock, pop, blues and jazz songs, as evidenced on their self-titled first album from 1969, and its follow-up Time and a Word from 1970. A change of direction later in 1970 led to a series of successful progressive rock albums, with four consecutive U.S. platinum or multi-platinum sellers in The Yes Album (1971), Fragile (1971), Close to the Edge (1972) and the live album Yessongs (1973). Further albums, Tales from Topographic Oceans (1973), Relayer (1974), Going for the One (1977) and Tormato (1978), were also commercially successful. Yes toured as a major rock act that earned the band a reputation for their elaborate stage sets, light displays, and album covers designed by Roger Dean. The success of "Roundabout", the single from Fragile, cemented their popularity across the decade and beyond. Anderson and Squire remained with the group throughout the 1970s, with Banks, Kaye, and Bruford all departing across 1970–1972, and being replaced by Howe, Rick Wakeman, and Alan White, respectively. Wakeman would leave the group in 1974, but returned two years later, with Patrick Moraz taking his place in the interim. After a final album, Drama, and tour in 1980, both of which saw Downes and Trevor Horn replace Wakeman and Anderson, respectively, Yes disbanded in 1981.

In 1983, Squire and White reformed Yes, with Anderson and Kaye returning, and guitarist Trevor Rabin joining. Rabin's songwriting helped move the band toward a more mainstream rock style. The result was 90125 (1983), their highest-selling album, featuring the U.S. number-one single "Owner of a Lonely Heart". Its follow-up, Big Generator (1987), was also successful. From 1991 to 1992, Yes were an eight-member formation after they merged with spinoff Anderson Bruford Wakeman Howe for Union (1991) and its tour. From 1994 to 2004, Yes regularly released albums with varied levels of success. After a four-year hiatus, they resumed touring in 2008 and have continued to release new albums; their latest, Mirror to the Sky, is set to be released on May 19, 2023. Throughout the long history of Yes, current and former members have often collaborated outside of the official band context; most recently, the group Yes Featuring Jon Anderson, Trevor Rabin, Rick Wakeman toured from 2016 to 2018. Among the longest serving members of the band, Squire (the last original member) died in 2015, and White died in 2022.

Yes are one of the most successful, influential, and longest-lasting progressive rock bands. They have sold 13.5 million RIAA-certified albums in the U.S., as well as more than 30 million albums worldwide. In 1985, they won a Grammy Award for Best Rock Instrumental Performance with "Cinema", and received five Grammy nominations between 1985 and 1992. They were ranked No. 94 on VH1's 100 Greatest Artists of Hard Rock. Their discography spans 22 studio albums. In April 2017, Yes were inducted into the Rock and Roll Hall of Fame, which chose to induct current and former members Anderson, Squire, Bruford, Kaye, Howe, Wakeman, White, and Rabin.

History

1968–1971: Formation and breakthrough 

In early 1968, bassist Chris Squire formed the psychedelic rock band Mabel Greer's Toyshop. The line-up consisted of Squire, singer and guitarist Clive Bayley, drummer Bob Hagger and guitarist Peter Banks. They played at the Marquee Club in Soho, London where Jack Barrie, owner of the nearby La Chasse club, saw them perform. "There was nothing outstanding about them", he recalled, "the musicianship was very good but it was obvious they weren't going anywhere". Barrie introduced Squire to singer Jon Anderson, a worker at the bar in La Chasse, who found they shared interests in Simon & Garfunkel and harmony singing. That evening at Squire's house they wrote "Sweetness," which was included on the first Yes album. Meanwhile, Banks had left Mabel Greer's Toyshop to join Neat Change, but he was dismissed by this group on 7 April 1968. In June 1968, Hagger was replaced in the nascent Yes by Bill Bruford, who had placed an advertisement in Melody Maker, and Banks was recalled by Squire, replacing Bayley as guitarist. Finally, the classically trained organist and pianist Tony Kaye, of Johnny Taylor's Star Combo and the Federals, became the keyboardist and the fifth member. The newborn band rehearsed in the basement of The Lucky Horseshoe cafe on Shaftesbury Avenue between 10 June and 9 July 1968.

Anderson suggested that they call the new band Life. Squire suggested that it be called World. Banks responded, simply, "yes", and that was how the band were named. Banks has also stated that he thought of the name "Yes" a couple of years beforehand. The first gig under the new brand followed at a youth camp in East Mersea, Essex on 4 August 1968. Early sets were formed of cover songs from artists such as the Beatles, The 5th Dimension and Traffic. On 16 September, Yes performed at Blaise's club in London as a substitute for Sly and the Family Stone, who had failed to turn up. They were well received by the audience, including the host Roy Flynn, who became the band's manager that night. That month, Bruford decided to quit performing to study at the University of Leeds. His replacement, Tony O'Reilly of the Koobas, struggled to perform with the rest of the group on stage and former Warriors and future King Crimson drummer Ian Wallace subbed for one gig on 5 November 1968. After Bruford was refused a year's sabbatical leave from Leeds, Anderson and Squire convinced him to return for Yes's supporting slot for Cream's farewell concert at the Royal Albert Hall on 26 November.

After seeing an early King Crimson gig in 1969, Yes realised that there was suddenly stiff competition on the London gigging circuit, and they needed to be much more technically proficient, starting regular rehearsals. They subsequently signed a deal with Atlantic Records, and, that August, released their debut album Yes. Compiled of mostly original material, the record includes renditions of "Every Little Thing" by the Beatles and "I See You" by The Byrds. Although the album failed to break into the UK album charts, Rolling Stone critic Lester Bangs complimented the album's "sense of style, taste and subtlety". Melody Maker columnist Tony Wilson chose Yes and Led Zeppelin as the two bands "most likely to succeed".

Following a tour of Scandinavia with Faces, Yes performed a solo concert at the Queen Elizabeth Hall on 21 March 1970. The second half consisted of excerpts from their second album Time and a Word, accompanied by a 20-piece youth orchestra. Banks left the group on 18 April 1970, just three months before the album's release. Having expressed dissatisfaction with the idea of recording with an orchestra as well as the sacking of Flynn earlier in the year, Banks later indicated that he was fired by Anderson and Squire, and that Kaye and Bruford had no prior knowledge that it would be happening. Similar to the first album, Time and a Word features original songs and two new covers–"Everydays" by Buffalo Springfield and "No Opportunity Necessary, No Experience Needed" by Richie Havens. The album broke into the UK charts, peaking at number 45. Banks' replacement was Tomorrow guitarist Steve Howe, who appears in the photograph of the group on the American issue despite not having played on it.

The band retreated to a rented farmhouse in Devon to write and rehearse new songs for their following album. Howe established himself as an integral part of the group's sound with his Gibson ES-175 and variety of acoustic guitars. With producer and engineer Eddy Offord, recording sessions lasted as long as 12 hours with each track being assembled from small sections at a time, which were pieced together to form a complete track. The band would then learn to play the song through after the final mix was complete. Released in February 1971, The Yes Album peaked at number 4 in the UK and number 40 on the U.S. Billboard 200 charts.

Yes embarked on a 28-day tour of Europe with Iron Butterfly in January 1971. The band purchased Iron Butterfly's entire public address system, which improved their on-stage performance and sound. Their first date in North America followed on 24 June in Edmonton, Canada, supporting Jethro Tull. Friction arose between Howe and Kaye on tour; this, along with Kaye's reported reluctance to play the Mellotron and the Minimoog synthesizer, preferring to stick exclusively to piano and Hammond organ, led to the keyboardist being fired from the band in the summer of 1971. Anderson recalled in a 2019 interview: "Steve and Chris came over and said, 'Look, Tony Kaye... great guy.' But, you know, we'd just seen Rick Wakeman about a month earlier. And I said, 'There's that Rick Wakeman guy,' and we've got to get on with life and move on, you know, rather than keep going on, set in the same circle. And that's what happens with a band."

1971–1974: Fragile, Close to the Edge and Tales from Topographic Oceans 

At the time of Kaye's departure, Yes had already found their new keyboardist—Rick Wakeman, a classically trained player who had left the folk rock group Strawbs earlier in the year. He was already a noted studio musician, with credits including T. Rex, David Bowie, Cat Stevens and Elton John. Squire commented that he could play "a grand piano for three bars, a Mellotron for two bars and a Moog for the next one absolutely spot on", which gave Yes the orchestral and choral textures that befitted their new material.

Released on 26 November 1971, the band's fourth album Fragile showcased their growing interest in the structures of classical music, with an excerpt of The Firebird by Igor Stravinsky being played at the start of their concerts since the album's 1971–1972 tour. Each member performed a solo track on the album, and it marked the start of their long collaboration with artist Roger Dean, who designed the group's logo, album art and stage sets. Fragile peaked at number 7 in the UK and number 4 in the U.S. after it was released there in January 1972, and was their first record to reach the top ten in North America. A shorter version of the opening track, "Roundabout", was released as a single that peaked at number 13 on the Billboard Hot 100 singles chart.

In February 1972, Yes recorded a cover version of "America" by Paul Simon and released it in July. The single reached number 46 on the U.S. singles chart. The track subsequently appeared on The New Age of Atlantic, a 1972 compilation album of several bands signed to Atlantic Records, and again in the 1975 compilation Yesterdays.

Released in September 1972, Close to the Edge, the band's fifth album, was their most ambitious work so far. At 19 minutes, the title track took up an entire side on the vinyl record and combined elements of classical music, psychedelic rock, pop and jazz. The album reached number 3 in the U.S. and number 4 on the UK charts. "And You and I" was released as a single that peaked at number 42 in the U.S. The growing critical and commercial success of the band was not enough to retain Bruford, who left Yes in the summer of 1972, before the album's release, to join King Crimson. The band considered several possible replacements, including Aynsley Dunbar (who was playing with Frank Zappa at the time), and decided on former Plastic Ono Band drummer Alan White, a friend of Anderson and Offord who had once sat in with the band weeks before Bruford's departure. White learned the band's repertoire in three days before embarking on their 1972–1973 tour.

By this point, Yes were beginning to enjoy worldwide commercial and critical success. Their early touring with White was featured on Yessongs, a triple live album released in May 1973 that documented shows from 1972. The album reached number 7 in the UK and number 12 in the U.S. A concert film of the same name premiered in 1975 that documented their shows at London's Rainbow Theatre in December 1972, with added psychedelic visual images and effects.

Tales from Topographic Oceans was the band's sixth studio album, released on 7 December 1973. It marked a change in their fortunes and polarised fans and critics alike. The double vinyl set was based on Anderson's interpretation of the Shastric scriptures from a footnote within Paramahansa Yogananda's book Autobiography of a Yogi. The album became the first LP in the UK to ship gold before the record arrived at retailers. It went on to top the UK charts for two weeks while reaching number 6 in the U.S., and became the band's fourth consecutive gold album. Wakeman was not pleased with the record and is critical of much of its material. He felt sections were "bled to death" and contained too much musical padding. Wakeman left the band after the 1973–1974 tour; his solo album Journey to the Centre of the Earth topped the UK charts in May 1974. The tour included five consecutive sold-out shows at the Rainbow Theatre, the first time a rock band achieved this.

1974–1980: Relayer, Going for the One, Tormato and the Paris sessions 
Several musicians were approached to replace Wakeman, including Vangelis Papathanassiou, Eddie Jobson of Roxy Music and former Atlantis/Cat Stevens keyboardist Jean Roussel. Howe says he also asked Keith Emerson, who did not want to leave Emerson, Lake & Palmer. Yes ultimately chose Swiss keyboardist Patrick Moraz of Refugee, who arrived in August 1974 during the recording sessions for Relayer, which took place at Squire's home in Virginia Water, Surrey. Released in November that year, Relayer showcased a jazz fusion-influenced direction the band were pursuing. The album features the 22-minute track titled "The Gates of Delirium", which highlights a battle initially inspired by War and Peace by Leo Tolstoy. Its closing section, "Soon", was subsequently released as a single. The album reached No. 4 in the UK and No. 5 in the U.S. Yes embarked on their 1974–1975 tour to support Relayer. The compilation album Yesterdays, released in 1975, contained tracks from Yes's first two albums, the B-side track from their "Sweet Dreams" single from 1970 titled "Dear Father", and the original ten-minute version of their cover of "America".

Between 1975 and 1976, each member of the band released a solo album. Their subsequent 1976 tour of North America with Peter Frampton featured some of the band's most-attended shows. The show of 12 June, also supported by Gary Wright and Pousette-Dart Band at John F. Kennedy Stadium in Philadelphia, attracted over 100,000 people. Roger Dean's brother Martyn was the main designer behind the tour's "Crab Nebula" stage set, while Roger and fabric designer Felicity Youette provided the backgrounds.

In late 1976, the band travelled to Switzerland and started recording for their album Going for the One at Mountain Studios, Montreux. It was then that Anderson sent early versions of "Going for the One" and "Wonderous Stories" to Wakeman, who felt he could contribute to such material better than the band's past releases. Moraz was let go, after Wakeman was booked on a session musician basis. Upon its release in July 1977, Going for the One topped the UK album charts for two weeks and reached number 8 in the U.S. "Wonderous Stories" and "Going for the One" were released as singles in the UK and reached numbers 7 and 25, respectively. Although the album's cover was designed by Hipgnosis, it still features their Roger Dean "bubble" logotype. The band's 1977 tour spanned across six months.

Tormato was released in September 1978 at the height of punk rock in England, during which the music press criticised Yes as representing the bloated excesses of early-1970s progressive rock. The album saw the band continuing their movement towards shorter songs; no track runs longer than eight minutes. Wakeman replaced his Mellotrons with the Birotron, a tape replay keyboard, and Squire experimented with harmonisers and Mu-tron pedals with his bass. Production was handled collectively by the band and saw disagreements at the mixing stage among the members. With heavy commercial rock-radio airplay, the album reached number 8 in the UK and number 10 in the U.S. charts, and was also certified platinum (1 million copies sold) by the RIAA. Despite internal and external criticisms of the album, the band's 1978–1979 tour was a commercial success. Concerts were performed in the round with a £50,000 revolving stage and a 360-degree sound system fitted above it. Their dates at Madison Square Gardens earned Yes a Golden Ticket Award for grossing over $1 million in box office receipts.

In October 1979, the band convened in Paris with producer Roy Thomas Baker. Their diverse approach was now succumbing to division, as Anderson and Wakeman favoured the more fantastical and delicate approach while the rest preferred a heavier rock sound. Howe, Squire and White liked none of the music Anderson was offering at the time as it was too lightweight and lacking in the heaviness that they were generating in their own writing sessions. The Paris sessions abruptly ended in December after White broke his foot while rollerskating in a roller disco.

When the band, minus Wakeman (who had only committed to recording keyboard overdubs once new material would be ready to record), reconvened in February to resume work on the project, their growing musical differences, combined with internal dissension, obstructed progress. Journalist Chris Welch, after attending a rehearsal, noted that Anderson "was singing without his usual conviction and seemed disinclined to talk". By late March, Howe, Squire and White had begun demoing material as an instrumental trio, increasingly uncertain about Anderson's future involvement. Eventually, a serious band dispute over finance saw Anderson leave Yes, with a dispirited Wakeman departing at around the same time.

1980–1981: Drama and split 
In 1980, pop duo The Buggles (keyboardist Geoff Downes and singer Trevor Horn) secured the services of Brian Lane, who had managed Yes since 1970, as their manager. At this point, the departure of Anderson and Wakeman had been kept secret from everyone outside the Yes inner circle. Seeing an option of continuing the band with new creative input and expertise, Squire revealed the situation to Horn and Downes and suggested that they join Yes as full-time members. Horn and Downes accepted the invitation and the reconfigured band recorded the Drama album, which was released in August 1980. The record displayed a heavier, harder sound than the material Yes recorded with Anderson in 1979, opening with the lengthy hard rocker "Machine Messiah". The album received substantial radio airplay in the late summer–fall of 1980, and peaked at number 2 in the UK and number 18 in the U.S., though it was the first Yes album to not be certified Gold by the RIAA since 1971. Their 1980 tour of North America and the UK received a mixed reaction from audiences. They were well received in the United States and were awarded with a commemorative certificate after they performed a record 16 consecutive sold-out concerts at Madison Square Garden since 1974.

After the Drama tour, Yes reconvened in England to decide the band's next step, beginning by dismissing Lane as their manager. Horn chose to leave Yes to pursue a career in music production, with White and Squire next to depart. Left as the sole remaining members, Downes and Howe opted not to continue with the group and went their own separate ways in December 1980.

A live compilation album of Yes performances from 1976 to 1978, mixed in mid-1979 and originally intended for release in late 1979, was released as Yesshows in November 1980, peaking at number 22 in the UK charts and number 43 in the U.S.

An announcement came from the group's management in March 1981 confirming that Yes no longer existed.

Downes and Howe soon reunited to form Asia with former King Crimson bassist and vocalist John Wetton, and drummer Carl Palmer from Emerson, Lake & Palmer. Squire and White continued to work together, initially recording sessions with Jimmy Page for a proposed band called XYZ (short for "ex-Yes-and-Zeppelin") in the spring of 1981. Page's former bandmate Robert Plant was also to be involved as the vocalist but he lost enthusiasm, citing his ongoing grieving for recently deceased Led Zeppelin drummer John Bonham. The short-lived group produced a few demo tracks, elements of which would appear in Page's band the Firm and on future Yes tracks "Mind Drive" and "Can You Imagine?". In late 1981, Squire and White released "Run with the Fox", a Christmas single with Squire on vocals which received radio airplay through the 1980s and early 1990s during the Christmas periods. A second Yes compilation album, Classic Yes, was released in November 1981.

1982–1988: Reformation, 90125 and Big Generator 

In 1982, Phil Carson of Atlantic Records introduced Squire and White to guitarist and singer Trevor Rabin, who had initially made his name with the South African supergroup Rabbitt, subsequently releasing three solo albums, working as a record producer and even briefly considered being a member of Asia. The three teamed up in a new band called Cinema, for which Squire also recruited the original Yes keyboard player Tony Kaye. Despite the presence of three Yes musicians, Cinema was not originally intended to be a continuation of Yes, and entered the studio to record a debut album as a brand new group. Although Rabin and Squire initially shared lead vocals for the project, Trevor Horn was briefly brought into Cinema as a potential singer, but soon opted to become the band's producer instead.

Horn worked well with the band. However, his clashes with Tony Kaye (complicated by the fact that Rabin was playing most of the keyboards during the recording sessions) led to Kaye's departure after around six months of rehearsing. Meanwhile, Squire encountered Jon Anderson (who, since leaving Yes, had released two solo albums and had success with the Jon and Vangelis project) at a Los Angeles party and played him the Cinema demo tracks. Anderson was invited into the project as lead singer and joined in April 1983 during the last few weeks of the sessions, having comparatively little creative input beyond adding his lead vocals and re-writing some lyrics.

At the suggestion of record company executives, Cinema then changed their name to Yes in June 1983. Rabin initially objected to this, as he now found that he had inadvertently joined a reunited band with a history and expectations, rather than help launch a new group. However, the presence of four former Yes members in the band (three of whom were founding members, including the distinctive lead singer) suggested that the name change was sound commercial strategy. The new album marked a radical change in style as the revived Yes had adopted a pop rock sound that showed little of their progressive roots. This incarnation of the band has sometimes been informally referred to as "Yes-West", reflecting the band's new base in Los Angeles rather than London.

Yes released their comeback album 90125 (named after its catalogue serial number on Atco Records) in November 1983. It became their biggest-selling album, certified by the RIAA at triple-platinum (3 million copies) in sales in the U.S., and introduced the band to younger fans. "Owner of a Lonely Heart" topped the Hot Mainstream Rock Tracks chart for four weeks and went on to reach the number-one spot on the Billboard Hot 100 singles chart, the only single from Yes to do so, for two weeks in January 1984. Kaye's short-term replacement on keyboards, Eddie Jobson, appeared briefly in the original video but was edited out as much as possible once Kaye had been persuaded to return to the band.

In 1984, the singles "Leave It" and "It Can Happen" reached number 24 and 57, respectively. Yes also earned their only Grammy Award for Best Rock Instrumental Performance in 1985 for the two-minute track "Cinema". They were also nominated for an award for Best Pop Performance by a Duo or Group with Vocals with "Owner of a Lonely Heart", and a Best Rock Performance by a Duo or Group with Vocal award with 90125. The band's 1984–1985 tour was the most lucrative in their history and spawned the home video release 9012Live, a concert film directed by Steven Soderbergh with added special effects from Charlex that cost $1 million. Issued in 1985, an accompanying live album also appeared that year, 9012Live: The Solos, which earned Yes a nomination for a second Grammy Award for Best Rock Instrumental Performance for Squire's solo track, a rendition of "Amazing Grace".

Yes began recording for their twelfth album, Big Generator, in 1986. The sessions underwent many starts and stops due to the use of multiple recording locations in Italy, London and Los Angeles as well as interpersonal problems between Rabin and Horn, which kept the album from timely completion. Eventually Rabin took over final production, the album was released in September 1987, and immediately began receiving heavy radio airplay, with sales reaching number 17 in the UK and number 15 in the U.S. Big Generator earned Yes a nomination for a second Grammy Award for Best Rock Performance by a Duo or Group with Vocal in 1988, and was also certified platinum (with 1 million-plus in sales) by the RIAA. The single "Love Will Find a Way" topped the Mainstream Rock chart, while "Rhythm of Love" reached number 2 and "Shoot High Aim Low" number 11. The 1987–1988 tour ended with an appearance at Madison Square Garden on 14 May 1988 as part of Atlantic Records' 40th anniversary.

1988–1995: ABWH, Union and Talk 
By the end of 1988, Anderson felt creatively sidelined by Rabin and Squire and had grown tired of the musical direction of the "Yes-West" line-up. He took leave of the band, asserting that he would never stay in Yes purely for the money, and started work in Montserrat on a solo project that eventually involved Wakeman, Howe and Bruford. This collaboration led to suggestions that there would be some kind of reformation of the "classic" Yes, although from the start the project had included bass player Tony Levin, whom Bruford had worked with in King Crimson. The project, rather than taking over or otherwise using the Yes name, was called Anderson Bruford Wakeman Howe (ABWH).

Their eponymous album, released in June 1989, featured "Brother of Mine", which became an MTV hit and went gold in the United States. It later emerged that the four band members had not all recorded together; Anderson and producer Chris Kimsey slotted their parts into place. Howe has stated publicly that he was unhappy with the mix of his guitars on the album, though a version of "Fist of Fire" with more of Howe's guitars left intact appeared on the In a Word box set in 2002. ABWH toured in 1989 and 1990 as "An Evening of Yes Music" which featured Levin, keyboardist Julian Colbeck, and guitarist Milton McDonald as support musicians. A live album and home video were recorded and released in 1993, both titled An Evening of Yes Music Plus that featured Jeff Berlin on bass due to Levin suffering from illness. The tour was also dogged by legal battles sparked by Atlantic Records due to the band's references to Yes in promotional materials and the tour title.

Following the tour, the group returned to the recording studio to produce their second album, tentatively called Dialogue. After hearing the tracks, Arista Records refused to release the album as they felt the initial mixes were weak. They encouraged the group to seek outside songwriters, preferably ones who could help them deliver hit singles. Anderson approached Rabin about the situation, and Rabin sent Anderson a demo tape with three songs, indicating that ABWH could have one but had to send the others back. Arista listened to them and wanted all of them, proposing to create a combined album with both Yes factions. The "Yes-West" group were working on a follow-up to Big Generator and had been shopping around for a new singer, auditioning Roger Hodgson of Supertramp, Steve Walsh of Kansas, Robbie Nevil of "C'est la Vie" fame, and Billy Sherwood of World Trade. Walsh only spent one day with them, but Sherwood and the band worked well enough together and continued with writing sessions. Arista suggested that the "Yes-West" group, with Anderson on vocals, record the four songs to add to the new album which would then be released under the Yes name.

Union was released in April 1991 and is the thirteenth studio album from Yes. Each group played their own songs, with Anderson singing on all tracks. Squire sang background vocals on a few of the ABWH tracks, with Tony Levin playing all the bass on those songs. The album does not feature all eight members playing at once. The track "Masquerade" earned Yes a Grammy Award nomination for Best Rock Instrumental Performance in 1992. Union sold approximately 1.5 million copies worldwide, and peaked at number 7 in the UK and number 15 in the U.S. charts. Two singles from the album were released. "Lift Me Up" topped the Mainstream Rock charts in May 1991 for six weeks, while "Saving My Heart" peaked at number 9.

Almost the entire band have openly stated their dislike of Union. Bruford has disowned the album entirely, and Wakeman was reportedly unable to recognise any of his keyboard work in the final edit and threw his copy of the album out of his limousine. He has since referred to the album as "Onion" because it makes him cry when he thinks about it. Union Co-producer Jonathan Elias later stated publicly in an interview that Anderson, as the associate producer, knew of the session musicians' involvement. He added that he and Anderson had even initiated their contributions, because hostility between some of the band members at the time was preventing work from being accomplished. The 1991–1992 Union tour united all eight members on a revolving circular stage. Later in 1991, Atlantic Records issued Yesyears, a four-CD box set mixing classic tracks with rare and unreleased material. A home video of the same name, documenting the band's history and featuring interviews with the eight current members, as well as a behind the scenes look at the then-ongoing Union tour, was also released. Atlantic would issue two further compilation albums, the double CD/triple vinyl Yesstory and the single CD Highlights: The Very Best of Yes, in 1992 and 1993, respectively. Following the tour's conclusion in 1992, Bruford chose not to remain involved with Yes and returned to his jazz project Earthworks. Howe also ceased his involvement with the band at this time.

In 1993, the album Symphonic Music of Yes was released and features orchestrated Yes tracks arranged by Dee Palmer. Howe, Bruford and Anderson perform on the record, joined by the London Philharmonic Orchestra, the English Chamber Orchestra and the London Community Gospel Choir.

The following Yes studio album, as with Union, was masterminded by a record company, rather than by the band itself. Victory Music approached Rabin with a proposal to produce an album solely with the 90125 line-up. Rabin initially countered by requesting that Wakeman also be included. Rabin began assembling the album at his home, using the then-pioneering concept of a digital home studio, and used material written by himself and Anderson. The new album was well into production in 1993, but Wakeman's involvement had finally been cancelled, as his refusal to leave his long-serving management created insuperable legal problems.

Talk was released in March 1994 and is the band's fourteenth studio release. Its cover was designed by pop artist Peter Max. The record was largely composed and performed by Rabin, with the other band members following Rabin's tracks for their respective instrumentation. It was digitally recorded and produced by Rabin with engineer Michael Jay, using 3.4 GB of hard disk storage split among four networked Apple Macintosh computers running Digital Performer. The album blended elements of radio-friendly rock with a more structurally ambitious approach taken from the band's progressive blueprint, with the fifteen-minute track "Endless Dream". The album reached number 20 in the UK and number 33 in the U.S. The track "The Calling" reached number 2 on the Billboard Hot Mainstream Rock Tracks chart and "Walls", which Rabin had written with former Supertramp songwriter and co-founder Roger Hodgson, peaked at number 24. It also became Yes's second-last-charting single. Rabin and Hodgson wrote a lot of material together and became close friends. Yes performed "Walls" on Late Show with David Letterman on 20 June 1994.

The 1994 tour (for which the band included side man Billy Sherwood on additional guitar and keyboards) used a sound system developed by Rabin named Concertsonics which allowed the audience located in certain seating areas to tune portable FM radios to a specific frequency, so they could hear the concert with headphones.

In early 1995, following the tour, Rabin, feeling that he had achieved his highest ambitions with Talk, lamented its disappointing reception as being "just wasn't what people wanted to hear at the time" and noted at the conclusion of the tour that "I think I'm done" and returned to LA where he shifted his focus to composing for films. Kaye also left Yes to pursue other projects.

1995–2000: Keys to Ascension, Open Your Eyes and The Ladder 
In November 1995, Anderson, Squire and White resurrected the "classic" 1970s line-up of Yes by inviting Wakeman and Howe back to the band, recording two new lengthy tracks called "Be the One" and "That, That Is". In March 1996 Yes performed three live shows at the Fremont Theater in San Luis Obispo, California which were recorded and released, along with the new studio tracks, that October on CMC International Records as the Keys to Ascension album, which peaked at number 48 in the UK and number 99 in the U.S. A same-titled live video of the shows was also released that year.

Yes continued to record new tracks in the studio, drawing some material written around the time of the XYZ project. At one point the new songs were to be released as a studio album, but commercial considerations meant that the new tracks were eventually packaged with the remainder of the 1996 San Luis Obispo shows in November 1997 on Keys to Ascension 2. The record managed to reach number 62 in the UK, but failed to chart in the U.S. Disgruntled at the way a potential studio album had been sacrificed in favour of the Keys to Ascension releases (as well as the way in which a Yes tour was being arranged without his input or agreement), Wakeman left the group again. (The studio material from both albums would eventually be compiled and re-released without the live tracks onto a single CD, 2001's Keystudio.)

With Yes in disarray again, Squire turned to Billy Sherwood (by now the band's engineer) for help. Both men had been working on a side project called Conspiracy and reworked existing demos and recordings from there to turn them into Yes songs, and also worked on new material with Anderson and White. (Howe's involvement at this stage was minimal, mainly taking place towards the end of the sessions.) Sherwood's integral involvement with the writing, production, and performance of the music led to his finally joining Yes as a full member (taking on the role of harmony singer, keyboardist and second guitarist).

The results of the sessions were released in November 1997 as the seventeenth Yes studio album, Open Your Eyes (on the Beyond Music label, who ensured that the group had greater control in packaging and naming). The music (mainly at Sherwood's urging) attempted to bridge the differing Yes styles of the 1970s and 1980s. (Sherwood: "My goal was to try to break down those partisan walls—because all of the music was so good. There are people who won't listen to Genesis, say, after 1978, but I can't imagine that. I love all music. That was the one thing I tried to do, to bring unity. During the time I was with Yes, you heard new things, and classic things. For that, I am proud—to have aligned planets for a moment in time.") However, Open Your Eyes was not a chart success; the record peaked at number 151 on the Billboard 200 but failed to enter the charts in the UK. The title single managed to reach number 33 on the Mainstream Rock chart.

For the 1997/1998 Open Your Eyes tour, Yes hired Russian keyboard player Igor Khoroshev, who had played on some of the album tracks. Significantly, the tour setlist featured only a few pieces from the new album, and mostly concentrated on earlier material. Anderson and Howe, who had been less involved with the writing and production on Open Your Eyes than they'd wished, would express dissatisfaction about the album later.

By the time the band came to record their eighteenth studio album The Ladder with producer Bruce Fairbairn, Khoroshev had become a full-time member (with Sherwood now concentrating on songwriting, vocal arrangements and second guitar). With Khoroshev's classically influenced keyboard style, and with all members now making more or less equal writing contributions, the band's sound returned to its eclectic and integrated 1970s progressive rock style. The Ladder also featured Latin music ingredients and clear world music influences, mostly brought in by Alan White (although Fairbairn's multi-instrumentalist colleague Randy Raine-Reusch made a strong contribution to the album's textures). One of the album tracks, "Homeworld (The Ladder)", was written for Relic Entertainment's Homeworld, a real-time strategy computer game, and was used as the credits and outro theme.

The Ladder was released in September 1999, peaking at number 36 in the UK and number 99 in the U.S. While on tour in 1999 and early 2000, Yes recorded their performance at the House of Blues in Las Vegas on 31 October 1999, releasing it in September 2000 as a live album and DVD called House of Yes: Live from House of Blues. As Sherwood saw his role in Yes as creating and performing new music, and the rest of the band now wished to concentrate on performing the back catalogue, he amicably resigned from Yes at the end of the tour.

In summer 2000, Yes embarked on the three-month Masterworks tour of the United States, on which they performed only material which had been released between 1970 and 1974 (The Yes Album through to Relayer). While on tour, Khoroshev was involved in a backstage incident of sexual assault with a female security guard at Nissan Pavilion in Bristow, Virginia on 23 July 2000 and parted company with the band at the end of the tour.

2001–2004: Magnification and further touring 
In 2001, Yes released their nineteenth studio album Magnification. Recorded without a keyboardist, the album features a 60-piece orchestra conducted by Larry Groupé; the first time the band used an orchestra since Time and a Word in 1970. The record was not a chart success; it peaked at number 71 in the UK and number 186 in the U.S. The Yes Symphonic Tour ran from July to December 2001 and had the band performing on stage with an orchestra and American keyboardist Tom Brislin. Their two shows in Amsterdam, in November, were recorded for their 2002 DVD and 2009 CD release Symphonic Live. The band invited Wakeman to play with them for the filming, but he was on a solo tour at the time.

Following Wakeman's announcement of his return in April 2002, Yes embarked on their Full Circle Tour in 2002–2003 that included their first performances in Australia since 1973. The band's appearance in Montreux on this tour was documented on the album and DVD Live at Montreux 2003, released in 2007. A five CD box set In a Word: Yes (1969–) was released in July 2002, followed a year later by the compilation album The Ultimate Yes: 35th Anniversary Collection, which reached number 10 in the UK charts, their highest-charting album since 1991, and number 131 in the U.S. On 26 January 2004, the film Yesspeak premiered in a number of select theatres, followed by a closed-circuit live acoustic performance of the group. Both Yesspeak and the acoustic performance, titled Yes Acoustic: Guaranteed No Hiss, were released on DVD later on. A 35th anniversary tour followed in 2004 which was documented on the DVD Songs from Tsongas.

In 2004, Squire, Howe and White reunited for one night only with former members Trevor Horn, Trevor Rabin and Geoff Downes during a show celebrating Horn's career, performing three Yes songs. The show video was released in DVD in 2008 under the name Trevor Horn and Friends: Slaves to the Rhythm.

On 18 March 2003, minor planet (7707) Yes was named in honour of the band.

2004–2010: Hiatus, side collaborations and new line-up 
After their 35th Anniversary Tour, Yes described themselves as "on hiatus." Howe recalls this break as very much welcomed by the band due to the heavy touring of the previous year and a half, and in his opinion necessary since the band's performance on the later (European) shows of the Full Circle Tour had started to deteriorate as a result of heavier alcohol consumption by Squire and other members in spite of rules the band had agreed on in 2001 barring drinking prior to or during shows.

During this period, Anderson toured both solo and jointly with Wakeman (for concerts focused largely on Yes material); Squire released his long-awaited second solo album, and White launched his own eponymous band White (subsequently joining fellow Yes-men Tony Kaye and Billy Sherwood in CIRCA). Wakeman also continued to release solo material, as did Howe, who released three solo albums and also reunited to record, release and tour with once-and-future Yes bandmate Geoff Downes in the reunion of the original Asia line-up. Various members were also involved in overseeing the archival release The Word is Live.

In May 2008, a fortieth-anniversary Close to the Edge and Back Tour—which was to feature Oliver Wakeman on keyboards—was announced. Anderson has said that they had been preparing four new "lengthy, multi-movement compositions" for the tour, but he had expressed disinterest in producing a new studio album after the low sales of Magnification, suggesting that recording one was not "logical anymore." The tour was abruptly cancelled prior to rehearsals, after Anderson suffered an asthma attack and was diagnosed with acute respiratory failure, and was advised by doctors to avoid touring for six months.

In September 2008, the remaining three members, eager to resume touring regardless of Anderson's availability, announced a tour billed as Steve Howe, Chris Squire and Alan White of Yes, with Oliver Wakeman on keyboards and new lead singer Benoît David, a Canadian musician who'd previously played with Mystery and with Yes tribute band Close to the Edge. Anderson expressed his disappointment that his former bandmates had not waited for his recovery, nor handled the situation "in a more gentlemanly fashion," and while he wished them well, he referred to their ongoing endeavours as "solo work" and emphasised his view that their band "is not Yes." As Anderson was a co-owner of the Yes trademark, the remaining members agreed not to tour with the Yes name. The In the Present Tour started in November 2008, but it was cut short in the following February when Squire required emergency surgery on an aneurysm in his leg. Touring resumed in June 2009 and continued through 2010, with Asia and Peter Frampton supporting the band at several shows. In October 2009, Squire declared that the new line-up "is now Yes" and their 2010 studio sessions would yield material eventually to be released as From a Page.

2010–2015: Fly from Here, Heaven & Earth and album series tours 
In August 2010, it was announced that new material had been written for Fly from Here, Yes's twentieth studio album. Yes then signed a deal with Frontiers Records and began recording in Los Angeles with Trevor Horn serving as producer. Much of the album material was extrapolated from a pair of songs written by Horn and Geoff Downes around the time that they had been Yes members during 1980 and the Drama album. During the recording sessions, the band thought it would be wise to bring Downes back to replace Oliver Wakeman on keyboards, reasoning that he was closer to the material. Asserting that all studio recording was to be carried out by "the line-up that actually ... does the work," Howe dispelled rumours that an invitation to sing on the record had been extended to Anderson, who subsequently announced a new project as an ongoing collaboration with former Yes members Wakeman and Rabin.

Upon completion of recording in March 2011, and post-production a month later, the album was released worldwide that July. Fly from Here peaked at number 30 in the UK and 36 in the U.S.

In March 2011 Yes embarked on their Rite of Spring and Fly from Here tours to support Fly from Here, with Styx and Procol Harum supporting on select dates. 2011 saw the release of the live Yes album and DVD, In the Present – Live from Lyon, taken from the band's previous tour. Trevor Rabin joined the band in playing "Owner of a Lonely Heart" at one show in Los Angeles.

In February 2012, after David contracted a respiratory illness, he was replaced by Glass Hammer singer Jon Davison. Davison was recommended to Squire by their common friend Taylor Hawkins, drummer for the Foo Fighters. Following the announcement Anderson expressed his disappointment that "they had to get yet another singer after the guy who replaced me became ill," stating that he offered to "get back with them" due to his being "healthy again," and expressed his view that "they have let a lot of fans down." Davison would join Yes to complete the band's scheduled dates across the year.

On 7 March 2013, founding guitarist Peter Banks died of heart failure.

From March 2013 to June 2014, Yes completed their Three Album Tour where they performed The Yes Album, Close to the Edge and Going for the One in their entirety. During the tour, they led a progressive-rock themed cruise titled "Cruise to the Edge". A second cruise happened in April 2014, and the band headlined the November 2015 edition. The show on 11 May 2014 in Bristol was released as Like It Is: Yes at the Bristol Hippodrome in 2014, featuring performances of Going for the One and The Yes Album.

Heaven & Earth, the band's twenty-first studio album and first with Davison, was recorded between January and March 2014, at Neptune Studios in Los Angeles with Roy Thomas Baker as producer and former band member Billy Sherwood as engineer on backing vocals and mixer. Squire enjoyed working with Baker again, describing him as a "force in the studio" (Baker had previously worked with the group in the late 70s on a project that had ultimately been scrapped). Howe reflected that he "tried to slow down" the album production in hopes that "maybe we could refine it ..." and compared it to the success of the band's classic works in which they "arranged the hell out of" the material. He wrote later that Baker behaved erratically and was difficult to work with, and was dissatisfied with the final mixes of the album.

To promote Heaven & Earth, Yes resumed touring between July and November 2014 with a world tour covering North America, Europe, Australia, New Zealand and Japan, playing Fragile and Close to the Edge in their entirety with select songs from Heaven & Earth and encores. The show in Mesa, Arizona was released in 2015 as Like It Is: Yes at the Mesa Arts Center which features the performances of Close to the Edge and Fragile.

2015–2017: Squire's death, Sherwood rejoins, and Yes featuring ARW 
In May 2015, news of Squire's diagnosis with acute erythroid leukaemia was made public. This resulted in former guitarist Billy Sherwood replacing him for their 2015 summer North American tour with Toto between August–September, and their third annual Cruise to the Edge voyage in November, while Squire was receiving treatment. His condition deteriorated soon after, and he died on 27 June at his home in Phoenix, Arizona. Downes first announced Squire's death on Twitter. Squire asked White and Sherwood to continue the legacy of the band, which Sherwood recalled "was paramount in his mind ... so I'm happy to be doing that." Yes performed without Squire, for the first time in their 47-year history, on 7 August 2015 in Mashantucket, Connecticut. In November 2015, they completed their annual Cruise to the Edge voyage.

In January 2016, former Yes members Anderson, Rabin and Wakeman announced their new group, Anderson, Rabin and Wakeman (ARW), something that had been in the works for the previous six years. Wakeman stated that Squire's passing inspired them to go ahead with the band. Anderson said they had begun writing new material. Their first tour, An Evening of Yes Music and More, began in October 2016 and lasted for one year with drummer Lou Molino III and bassist Lee Pomeroy. Following Yes's induction into the Rock and Roll Hall of Fame, the band renamed themselves Yes featuring Jon Anderson, Trevor Rabin, Rick Wakeman. After a four-month tour in 2018 to celebrate the fiftieth anniversary of Yes, the group disbanded.

In 2016, Yes performed Fragile and Drama in their entirety on their April–June European tour. Trevor Horn was a guest vocalist for two UK shows, singing "Tempus Fugit". For the subsequent North American tour between July and September of that year, the set was changed to include Drama and sides one and four of Tales from Topographic Oceans. White missed the latter to recover from back surgery; he was replaced by American drummer Jay Schellen. Dylan Howe, Steve's son, had originally been asked to be White's standby, but was prevented from being involved by visa problems. White returned on a part-time basis in November for their 2016 Japanese tour; until the following February, Schellen continued to sit in for White on most shows, with White playing on some songs. The live album Topographic Drama – Live Across America, recorded on the 2016 tour, was released in late 2017 and marks Yes's first not to feature Squire. In February 2017, Yes toured the U.S. which included their headline spot at Cruise to the Edge.

Yes toured the U.S. and Canada with the Yestival Tour from August to September 2017, performing at least one song from each album from Yes to Drama. Dylan Howe joined the band as a second drummer. The tour was cut short following the unexpected death of Howe's son and Dylan's brother Virgil.

2018–2022: 50th anniversary, From A Page, The Quest and White's death 
In February 2018, Yes headlined Cruise to the Edge involving original keyboardist Tony Kaye as a special guest, marking his first performances with the band since 1994. This was followed by the band's 50th Anniversary Tour with a European leg in March, playing half of Tales from Topographic Oceans and a selection of songs from their history. The two London dates included an anniversary fan convention which coincided with the release of Fly from Here – Return Trip, a new version of the album with new lead vocals and mixes by Horn, who also performed as a special guest singer during a few shows on the leg. A U.S. leg in June and July also included guest performances from Kaye, Horn, Tom Brislin and Patrick Moraz, who had last performed with Yes in 1976. The tour culminated with a Japanese leg in February 2019. Schellen continued to play as a second drummer to support White, who had a bacterial infection in his joints from November 2017. The tour was documented with the live album Yes 50 Live, released in 2019.

In June and July 2019, Yes headlined the Royal Affair Tour across the U.S. with a line-up featuring Asia, John Lodge and Carl Palmer's ELP Legacy with Arthur Brown. This was followed by previously unreleased music, recorded during the Fly from Here sessions, released as From a Page, a release spearheaded by Oliver Wakeman who wrote most of its material. The CD version includes an expanded edition of In the Present – Live from Lyon. A live album from the Royal Affair Tour, entitled The Royal Affair Tour: Live from Las Vegas, was released in October 2020. Videos of Dean creating the album cover were streamed live on Facebook. Yes had planned to resume touring in 2020, beginning with a short U.S. leg in March and their appearance on Cruise to the Edge, followed by a European tour that continued their Album Series Tour and featured Relayer performed in its entirety. Both tours were postponed due to the COVID-19 pandemic. Later in 2020, Davison and Sherwood formed Arc of Life, a new group featuring Schellen and keyboardist Dave Kerzner.

Yes worked on new material for their twenty-second studio album The Quest, from late 2019 through 2021, with Howe as the sole producer. The lockdowns brought on by the COVID-19 pandemic resulted in members recording their parts in separate studios and sending them to Howe and engineer Curtis Schwartz in England. In 2021, Howe, Davison and Downes got together and completed the album. The Quest was released on 1 October 2021, being the band's first new album in seven years, and the opening two tracks, "The Ice Bridge" and "Dare to Know", were released as digital singles. The album reached No. 20 in the UK. By the time The Quest was released, Yes had already discussed plans regarding a follow-up album. In May 2022, Sherwood confirmed that the band had started to record new material.

On 22 May 2022, Yes announced that White would sit out of their upcoming tour due to health issues and that Schellen would handle the drums. White died on the 26th of May. The band kicked off a tour in June 2022 to commemorate the 50th anniversary of Close to the Edge. They had originally planned to resume their Album Series Tour with a European leg featuring Relayer performed in its entirety, before the dates were rescheduled for 2023 and the program changed. A tribute concert for White was held in Seattle on 2 October, featuring special guests and former Yes guitarist Trevor Rabin.

2023–present: Mirror to the Sky
In January 2023, Yes announced that Warner Music Group had acquired the recorded music rights and associated income streams relating to 12 studio albums from 1969 to 1987, and several live and compilation releases. In February, Schellen joined the band as a permanent member.

In 2023, Yes had planned to continue their Album Series Tour with Relayer performed in its entirety across Europe and the UK, but it was subsequently delayed to 2024 due to insurance incentives related to COVID-19 and acts of war being withdrawn.

On 10 March 2023, Yes announced that their new studio album, Mirror to the Sky, is set for release on 19 May. On the same day the opening track, "Cut from the Stars", was released as a digital single.

Rock and Roll Hall of Fame 
Yes were eligible to be inducted into the Rock and Roll Hall of Fame in 1994. In August 2013, the fan campaign Voices for Yes was launched to get the band inducted. The campaign was headed by two U.S. political operators: John Brabender, senior strategist for Republican Rick Santorum's 2012 U.S. presidential campaign, and Tad Devine, who worked on Democrat John Kerry's 2004 presidential campaign and Al Gore's 2000 campaign. Also involved were former NBC president Steve Capus and former White House Political Director Sara Taylor. On 16 October 2013, Yes failed to be inducted. In November 2013, Anderson expressed a wish to return to Yes in the future for a "tour everybody dreams of," and cited Yes's nomination for inclusion into the Rock and Roll Hall of Fame as a motive for a possible reunion.

On 7 April 2017, Yes were inducted into the 2017 class by Geddy Lee and Alex Lifeson of Rush in a ceremony held in New York City. The musicians inducted were Anderson, Howe, Rabin, Squire, Wakeman, Kaye, Bruford, and White, the same line-up featured on Union and its tour. Having failed to pass the nomination stage twice previously, the announcement of their forthcoming induction was made on 20 December 2016. In the ceremony, Anderson, Howe, Rabin, Wakeman, and White performed "Roundabout" with Lee on bass, followed by "Owner of a Lonely Heart" with Howe on bass. Bruford attended the ceremony but did not perform, while Kaye did not attend. Dylan Howe (Steve's son) described how at the ceremony the two groups—Yes and ARW—were seated at adjacent tables but ignored each other.

Band members

Current members 
 Steve Howe – guitars, vocals 
 Geoff Downes – keyboards 
 Billy Sherwood – bass guitar , vocals , guitars , keyboards ; 
 Jon Davison – lead vocals, acoustic guitar, percussion, keyboards 
 Jay Schellen – drums, percussion

Former members 
 Chris Squire – bass guitar, vocals 
 Jon Anderson – lead and backing vocals, guitar, percussion, occasional synthesizer 
 Bill Bruford – drums, percussion 
 Tony Kaye – organ, piano, synthesizer 
 Peter Banks – guitar, backing vocals 
 Tony O'Reilly – drums 
 Rick Wakeman – keyboards 
 Alan White – drums, percussion, piano, backing vocals 
 Patrick Moraz – keyboards 
 Trevor Horn – lead vocals, bass guitar 
 Trevor Rabin – guitars, lead and backing vocals, keyboards 
 Eddie Jobson – keyboards 
 Igor Khoroshev – keyboards, backing vocals 
 Benoît David – lead vocals, acoustic guitar 
 Oliver Wakeman – keyboards

Former live musicians 
 Ian Wallace – drums 
 Casey Young – keyboards 
 Tom Brislin – keyboards, backing vocals, percussion  
 Dylan Howe – drums

Timeline

Discography 

Studio albums

 Yes (1969)
 Time and a Word (1970)
 The Yes Album (1971)
 Fragile (1971)
 Close to the Edge (1972)
 Tales from Topographic Oceans (1973)
 Relayer (1974)
 Going for the One (1977)
 Tormato (1978)
 Drama (1980)
 90125 (1983)
 Big Generator (1987)
 Union (1991)
 Talk (1994)
 Keys to Ascension (1996)
 Keys to Ascension 2 (1997)
 Open Your Eyes (1997)
 The Ladder (1999)
 Magnification (2001)
 Fly from Here (2011)
 Heaven & Earth (2014)
 The Quest (2021)
 Mirror to the Sky (2023)

Tours

Citations

References

Bibliography

Further reading 
 Yes: The Authorized Biography, Dan Hedges, London, Sidgwick and Jackson Limited, 1981
 Yes: But What Does It Mean?, Thomas Mosbø, Milton, a Wyndstar Book, 1994
 Yesstories: Yes in Their Own Words, Tim Morse and Yes, St. Martin's Griffin Publishing, 15 May 1996
 Music of Yes: Structure and Vision in Progressive Rock, Bill Martin, Chicago e La Salle, Open Court, 1 November 1996
 Close To the Edge – The Story of Yes, Chris Welch, Omnibus Press, 1999/2003/2008
 Beyond and Before: The Formative Years of Yes, Peter Banks & Billy James, Bentonville, Golden Treasure Publishing, 2001
 Yes: Perpetual Change, David Watkinson and Rick Wakeman, Plexus Publishing, 1 November 2001
 Yes: An Endless Dream Of '70s, '80s And '90s Rock Music, Stuart Chambers, Burnstown, General Store Publishing House, 2002
 Yes Tales: An Unauthorized Biography of Rock's Most Cosmic Band, Scott Robinson, in Limerick Form, Lincoln, Writers Club Press, iUniverse Inc., 2002
 The Extraordinary World of Yes, Alan Farley, Paperback, 2004
 Mountains Come Out of the Sky: The Illustrated History of Prog Rock, Will Romano, 1 November 2010
 Yes in Australia, Brian Draper, Centennial, Sydney, 2010
 Close To The Edge - How Yes's Masterpiece Defined Prog Rock, Will Romano, 2017
 Yes, Aymeric Leroy, Le Mot et le Reste, 2017
 Solid Mental Grace: Listening to the Music of Yes, Simon Barrow, Cultured Llama Publishing, 2018

Songbooks 
 Yes Complete Vol. One − 1976 Warner Bros. Publications Inc.
 Yes Complete Vol. Two – 1977 Warner Bros. Publications Inc.
 Yes Complete – Deluxe Edition, 1 October 1981
 Yes: Back from the Edge, Mike Mettler, Guitar School 3, no. 5, September 1991
 Classic Yes – Selections from Yesyears, April 1993

External links 

 
 
 
 Forgotten Yesterdays

 
Atco Records artists
Atlantic Records artists
Eagle Records artists
Elektra Records artists
English art rock groups
English progressive rock groups
Grammy Award winners
Musical groups disestablished in 1981
Musical groups disestablished in 2004
Musical groups established in 1968
Musical groups from London
Musical groups reestablished in 1982
Musical groups reestablished in 2008
Musical quintets
Symphonic rock groups
1968 establishments in England